Quincy Johan Diggs (born April 8, 1990) is an American professional basketball player, who most recently played for Kaposvári KK of the Nemzeti Bajnokság I/A in Hungary.

College career
In the 2011–11 season, the Akron Zips qualified for the NCAA Tournament, where they lost to Notre Dame with Diggs scoring 11 points in the matchup. The following season Akron lost in the MAC tournament final to Ohio when Diggs's missed a desperation last second shot. The Zips participate in the National Invitation Tournament in 2012, however, they lost in the first round to Northwestern despite 18 points from Diggs. Diggs averaged 8.5 points, 3.1 rebounds and 2.4 assists per game as a junior and was MAC Sixth Man of the Year in 2012, but was suspended from the university for the next season, in what was later revealed to be fights with his girlfriend. After a year break Diggs returned to the team, which lost in the semifinals of the MAC championship after overtime against the eventual winner Western Michigan. This time Akron participated in the Collegeinsider.com Tournament (CIT), in which they lost 97–91 to IPFW in the first round despite 23 points from Diggs, which brought Diggs's career in college to an end. As a senior, Diggs posted 12.8 points, 4.6 rebounds and 2.6 assists and was named Second Team All-Mid-American Conference.

Professional career
Diggs signed with Redwell Gunners Oberwart in 2015 and averaged 20.0 points, 7.3 rebounds and 3.2 assists per game. He was named MVP of the Austrian league. In the 2016–2017 season, Diggs competed for Eisbaeren Bremerhaven. He averaged 13.3 points, 4.8 rebounds and 3.6 assists per game. In June 2017 he signed with the Czech team CEZ Nymburk. Diggs averaged 9.9 points and 5.5 rebounds per game with Nymburk. In November 2017, he inked with Boulazac Basket Dordogne. On July 24, 2018, Diggs moved to Greece for Kolossos Rodou. He was released from the Greek team on April 5, 2019.

On April 19, 2019, Diggs signed with Okapi Aalstar of the Belgium Pro Basketball League.  He later joined PVSK Panthers of the Hungarian league and averaged 13.1 points, 3.7 rebounds, 2.6 assists and 1.6 steals per game. On September 9, 2020, Diggs returned to Redwell Gunners Oberwart. He averaged 14 points, 5.4 rebounds, 4.1 assists and 1.8 steals per game. On August 10, 2021, Diggs signed with Fribourg Olympic Basket of the Swiss Basketball League.

On January 2, 2022, Diggs signed with Kaposvári KK of the Nemzeti Bajnokság I/A.

References

External links
RealGM profile
Akron Zips bio

1990 births
Living people
Akron Zips men's basketball players
American expatriate basketball people in Austria
American expatriate basketball people in Belgium
American expatriate basketball people in the Czech Republic
American expatriate basketball people in France
American expatriate basketball people in Germany
American expatriate basketball people in Greece
American expatriate basketball people in Hungary
American expatriate basketball people in Switzerland
American men's basketball players
Basketball players from Wichita, Kansas
Basketball Nymburk players
Eisbären Bremerhaven players
Kolossos Rodou B.C. players
New Orleans Privateers men's basketball players
Okapi Aalstar players
PVSK Panthers players
Small forwards